Chakram is a 2005 Indian Telugu-language drama film written and directed by Krishna Vamsi. It stars Prabhas in lead role as the titular character, while Asin and Charmy Kaur play the female leads. The music was composed by Chakri. The film was released on 25 March 2005 to mixed reviews. Chakram was a flop at the box office. However, it won two Nandi Awards. The film was dubbed in Bhojpuri under the same name and in Malayalam as Dharma Chakram.

Plot 
Chakram (Prabhas) is a foreign returnee who has a dream of building a hospital at Pulivendula. He is in love with his colleague and his cousin Lakshmi (Asin), who studied with him abroad. He for an unknown reason runs away from his marriage hall. he then moves to Hyderabad and stays in a place called "Sahara Colony". There, he tries to solve problems of the people in the colony. Seeing all this, another girl who is also named Lakshmi (Charmy) falls in love with Chakram. We later find out that he left because he found out he has blood cancer.

Cast

Prabhas as Chakram
Asin as Lakshmi
Charmy Kaur as Lakshmi
Prakash Raj as Chakram's father,peddireddy
Urvashi as Chakram's mother
Tanikella Bharani as Lakshmi's (Asin) father
Rajya Lakshmi as Lakshmi's (Charmy) mother
Radha Kumari as Lakshmi's (Charmy) grandmother
Venu Madhav as Auto Driver
M. S. Narayana as Watchman
Raghu Babu as Conman
Santhosh Keezhattoor as Giri
Ahuti Prasad as Ram Prasad
Mallikarjuna Rao
Srinivasa Reddy
Bhuvaneswari
Shiva Reddy
A.V.S.
Delhi Rajeswari
Narayana Rao
Kalpana
 Vajja Venkata Giridhar as Henchman
B. Padmanabham as himself
Brahmanandam as railway T.C. (Cameo)

Soundtrack
The music was composed by Chakri.

Reception 
A critic from Rediff.com opined that "despite spending lavishly, a wafer-thin plot ensures a loser". Jeevi of Idlebrain.com said that "On the whole, Chakram disappoints". A critic from Full Hyderabad wrote that "Not worth a watch unless there is nothing better around".

Awards
Nandi Awards
Best Director - Krishna Vamsi
Best Lyricist - Sirivennela Sitarama Sastry for "Jagamantha Kutumbam"

References

External links 
 

2000s Telugu-language films
Films scored by Chakri
2005 films
Films directed by Krishna Vamsi
2005 romantic comedy-drama films
Indian films about cancer
Indian romantic comedy-drama films